La Mesa is a city in San Diego County, located  east of Downtown San Diego in Southern California. The population was 61,121 at the 2020 census, up from 57,065 at the 2010 census. Its civic motto is "the Jewel of the Hills."

History

La Mesa in Spanish means "the table", or alternately "the plateau", relating to its geography. La Mesa was part of a larger tract, Mission San Diego de Alcalá, and was used by Spanish missionaries.

La Mesa was founded in 1869 and The City of La Mesa was incorporated on February 16, 1912. It does not have a city charter but operates under the laws of the state of California.

Its official flower is the bougainvillea.

In 2020, La Mesa was the site of civil unrest in the wake of the murder of George Floyd in Minneapolis, Minnesota. Two days after Floyd's murder, an unarmed black man was grabbed and shoved by a white La Mesa Police officer and arrested at the Grossmont Trolley Station. The video of the incident went viral and led to more than 1000 protesters converging on the city. An African-American grandmother was shot in the face with a bean bag round from police. The officer in the trolley station incident was charged with falsifying a police report in connection with the reason for the arrest but acquitted in December 2021.

Geography
La Mesa is bordered by the city of San Diego on the west and north, Spring Valley and Lemon Grove on the south, and El Cajon on the east. It includes the neighborhood of Grossmont.

Climate 

Because of this, La Mesa typically experiences more extreme temperatures than San Diego, most of which lies closer to the Pacific Ocean. La Mesa has a Semi-arid Steppe climate. La Mesa typically has hot, dry summers and warm winters with most of the annual precipitation falling between November and March. Summer temperatures are generally hot, with average highs of 78 °F-92 °F (26 °C–33 °C) and lows of 56 °F–68 °F (13 °C–20 °C). Winter temperatures are warm, with average high temperatures of 66 °F–77 °F (19 °C–25 °C) and lows of 46 °F–58 °F (8 °C–14 °C).

The climate in the San Diego area, like much of California, often varies significantly over short geographical distances, resulting in micro-climates. In San Diego's case, this is mainly due to the city's topography (the Bay, and the numerous hills, mountains, and canyons). This happens every year in May and June. Even in the absence of June gloom, inland areas tend to experience higher temperatures than areas closer to the coast.

Transportation
The City of La Mesa is served by the San Diego Trolley's Orange Line at its stations in Spring Street, La Mesa Boulevard, Grossmont Transit Center, and Amaya Drive, the last two of which are also served by the Green Line.

By car, the city is served by Interstate 8, California State Route 94, and California State Route 125.

Demographics

2010
At the 2010 census La Mesa had a population of 57,065. The racial makeup of La Mesa was 54.1% White, Hispanic or Latino of any race was 21.5%, 8.0% African American, 5.8% Asian, 0.8% Native American, 0.6% Pacific Islander, 11.6% from other races, and 5.8% from two or more races.

The census reported that 56,408 people (98.8% of the population) lived in households, 124 (0.2%) lived in non-institutionalized group quarters, and 533 (0.9%) were institutionalized.

There were 24,512 households, 6,695 (27.3%) had children under the age of 18 living in them, 9,330 (38.1%) were opposite-sex married couples living together, 3,102 (12.7%) had a female householder with no husband present, 1,335 (5.4%) had a male householder with no wife present. There were 1,731 (7.1%) unmarried opposite-sex partnerships, and 243 (1.0%) same-sex married couples or partnerships. 8,004 households (32.7%) were one person and 2,924 (11.9%) had someone living alone who was 65 or older. The average household size was 2.30. There were 13,767 families (56.2% of households); the average family size was 2.94.

The age distribution was 11,164 people (19.6%) under the age of 18, 6,396 people (11.2%) aged 18 to 24, 16,792 people (29.4%) aged 25 to 44, 14,625 people (25.6%) aged 45 to 64, and 8,088 people (14.2%) who were 65 or older. The median age was 37.1 years. For every 100 females, there were 90.8 males. For every 100 females age 18 and over, there were 88.1 males.

There were 26,167 housing units at an average density of 2,870.3 per square mile, of the occupied units 11,221 (45.8%) were owner-occupied and 13,291 (54.2%) were rented. The homeowner vacancy rate was 1.4%; the rental vacancy rate was 7.2%. 26,713 people (46.8% of the population) lived in owner-occupied housing units and 29,695 people (52.0%) lived in rental housing units.

2000

At the 2000 census there were 54,749 people in 24,186 households, including 13,374 families, in the city. The population density was 5,909.9 inhabitants per square mile (2,282.8/km). The racial makeup of the city was 51.0% White, 6.7% African American, 0.6% Native American, 5.5% Asian, 0.4% Pacific Islander, 9.5% from other races, and 4.3% from two or more races. Hispanic or Latino of any race were 26.6%.

Of the 24,186 households 24.7% had children under the age of 18 living with them, 39.8% were married couples living together, 11.6% had a female householder with no husband present, and 44.7% were non-families. 34.2% of households were one person and 12.9% were one person aged 65 or older. The average household size was 2.22 and the average family size was 2.86.

The age distribution was 19.8% under the age of 18, 9.9% from 18 to 24, 32.9% from 25 to 44, 20.3% from 45 to 64, and 17.0% 65 or older. The median age was 37 years. For every 100 females, there were 89.3 males. For every 100 females age 18 and over, there were 86.2 males.

The median household income was $41,693 and the median family income was $50,398. Males had a median income of $37,215 versus $30,413 for females. The per capita income for the city was $22,372. About 5.2% of families and 9.4% of the population were below the poverty line, including 10.4% of those under age 18 and 6.2% of those age 65 or over.

Current estimates 
According to estimates by the San Diego Association of Governments (not adjusted for inflation). When adjusted for inflation (1999 dollars; comparable to Census data above), the median household income was $45,156.

Arts and culture

Farmer's market
There is a farmer's market in La Mesa Village every Friday afternoon.

Flag Day Parade
On June 14, 1997, with the help of Councilmember Ruth Sterling, the City of La Mesa inaugurated its First Annual Flag Day Parade.

La Mesa Walkway of the Stars
The “Walkway of the Stars” is a pedestrian walkway that has been transformed into an urban park in downtown La Mesa. The vision for a place to recognize La Mesa's extraordinary volunteers was provided by Councilmember Ruth Sterling. The park's theme honors the city's outstanding volunteers who have provided 10,000 or more hours of service to the city of La Mesa. “Walkway of the Stars” is located between the Allison Avenue municipal parking lot and La Mesa Boulevard.

Oktoberfest
At the beginning of each October, La Mesa holds its biggest event of the year, Oktoberfest, attended by approximately 200,000 people over the three nights of the event.

Back to the 50s Car Show
The Back to the '50s Car Show is an annual summer event where classic car enthusiasts come to display their vehicles. The event is held every Thursday evening during the months of June through August in La Mesa Village along La Mesa Boulevard. Admission to the event is free.

Sundays At Six
Sundays At Six is a free concert series that is offered every year in the months of June and July. For six Sundays, free concerts are performed in Harry Griffen Park from 6pm to 7pm. The concerts began in 2002 after being conceived by then-city councilman Mark Arapostathis and assistant city manager Yvonne Garrett along with members of the community. They are organized by the La Mesa Arts Alliance and sponsored by the Boys & Girls Clubs of East County Foundation.

Other events
Other annual events include Christmas in the Village, and Antique Street Fair.

Grossmont Center
The city's major mall, Grossmont Center, opened by the Cushman Family in 1961. In 2021, Grossmont Center was purchased from the Cushman Family by Federal Realty Trust, which valued the shopping center at $175 Million and plans to redevelop and modernize the 925,000 square-foot property.

Alternative media
The original offices of The San Diego Door, a popular underground newspaper of the 1960s, were located in La Mesa at 7053 University Avenue.

Government

City government
La Mesa is a general law city which uses a council-manager system of government with a directly elected mayor. The city council consists of a mayor and four councilmembers, all of whom are elected from the city at large and serve four-year terms. The council meets on the second and fourth Tuesday of each month. The current mayor is Mark Arapostathis, who was re-elected in 2018.

State and federal representation

Education
The schools in La Mesa are operated by two districts. The La Mesa-Spring Valley School District operates most of the elementary and middle schools in the city, while the Grossmont Union High School District operates Helix High School and the Gateway day schools.

Elementary schools
 Rolando Elementary School (La Mesa-Spring Valley School District)
 La Mesa Dale Elementary School (La Mesa-Spring Valley School District)
 Maryland Avenue Elementary School (La Mesa-Spring Valley School District)
 RHR DFAF Private Charter School
 Murdock Elementary School (La Mesa-Spring Valley School District)
 Murray Manor Elementary School (La Mesa-Spring Valley School District)
 Northmont Elementary School (La Mesa-Spring Valley School District)
 Lemon Avenue Elementary School (La Mesa-Spring Valley School District)
 Vista La Mesa Academy (Lemon Grove School District)
 Shepherd of the Hills Lutheran School (private, K-8)
 St. Martin's Academy (private)
 Liberty Charter School (private)
 San Diego Jewish Academy (private)
 Christ Lutheran School (private)
 Innovation Center La Mesa – Julian Charter School (charter)
 La Mesa Arts Academy (4th - 8th Grade) - La Mesa-Spring Valley School District

Middle/junior high schools
 Parkway Middle School (La Mesa-Spring Valley School District)
 La Mesa Arts Academy (4-8 Grade) (LMAAC) (La Mesa-Spring Valley School District)
 Vista La Mesa Academy (Lemon Grove School District)
 Shepherd of the Hills Lutheran School (private, K-8)

High schools
 Helix High School (Grossmont Union High School District)
 Grossmont High School (Grossmont Union High School District) includes some students from La Mesa while having an El Cajon street address

K–12
 Gateway Community Day (Grossmont Union High School District)
 Gateway West Community Day (Grossmont Union High School District)
 Mt. Helix Academy (Private Administration)

Notable people 

 Aaron Boone, retired baseball player and manager
 Reggie Bush, retired football player
 Brian Patrick Butler, actor and filmmaker
 Ammar Campa-Najjar (born 1989), Democratic politician
 Brooks Conrad, baseball player
 Ralph Drollinger, basketball player and religious minister
 Josquin Des Pres, producer and bassist
 Dennis Hopper, actor/producer/photographer
 Dave Mustaine, founding guitarist/vocalist of Megadeth
 Diana Napolis, social worker and celebrity stalker 
 Ellen Ochoa, engineer and astronaut
 Willie O'Ree, hockey player
 Jason Phillips (catcher), former baseball catcher for New York Mets
 Goldie Rapp, third baseman for the Philadelphia Phillies
 Steve Roach, ambient musician
 Claudia Sandoval, MasterChef winner
 Cathy Scott, true-crime author
 Whitney Shay, blues, soul, and rhythm and blues singer and songwriter
 Alex Smith, retired football player who was raised in La Mesa.
 Eddie Vedder, vocalist/guitarist of Pearl Jam
 Bill Walton, basketball player and sportscaster
Frank Zappa, musician, composer, songwriter

See also

References

External links

La Mesa Village Merchants Association
City-Data.com
La Mesa Community Website
La Mesa Courier - monthly newspaper

 
Cities in San Diego County, California
East County (San Diego County)
San Diego metropolitan area
Incorporated cities and towns in California
Populated places established in 1912
1912 establishments in California